Jean-André Valletaux (born 23 November 1773 in Hiersac; † 23 June 1811 Cogorderos) was a French military commander during the French Revolutionary Wars and Napoleonic Wars, Brig-General in the Peninsular War, and Commander of the Legion of Honour.

Valletaux died as commander of the French forces at the Battle of Cogorderos, in Spain.  His name is one of those inscribed under the Arc de Triomphe.

References
 Pope, Stephen (1999). The Cassel Dictionary of the Napoleonic Wars. Cassel. .
 Schneid, Frederick C. (2011). The French Revolutionary and Napoleonic Wars. Mainz: Institute of European History.
 Gates, David (1986). The Spanish Ulcer: A History of the Peninsular War. Pimlico 2002. 

1773 births
1811 deaths
Commandeurs of the Légion d'honneur
French military personnel of the French Revolutionary Wars
French generals
French commanders of the Napoleonic Wars
French military personnel killed in the Napoleonic Wars
People from Charente
Names inscribed under the Arc de Triomphe